Secondigny is a commune in the Deux-Sèvres department in western France.

It is situated about 14 km west of the town of Parthenay and 35 km north of Niort.

Secondigny is the source of the Thouet, a river that flows east and then north before joining the Loire near Saumur. Just to the west of Secondigny is the source of the Sèvre Nantaise, which flows west and north to join the Loire in Nantes.

See also
Communes of the Deux-Sèvres department

References

Communes of Deux-Sèvres